The 2022 Washington State Cougars football team represented Washington State University during the 2022 NCAA Division I FBS football season. The Cougars played their home games at Martin Stadium in Pullman, Washington, and competed as members of the Pac–12 Conference. They were led by head coach Jake Dickert, in his second season.

Schedule

Roster

Game summaries

vs Idaho Vandals

at No. 19 Wisconsin Badgers

vs Colorado State Rams

vs No. 15 Oregon Ducks

vs California

at No. 6 USC

at Oregon State

vs No. 14 Utah

at Stanford

vs Arizona State

at Arizona

vs No. 13 Washington

vs. Fresno State (LA Bowl)

Awards

Staff

Rankings

References

Washington State
Washington State Cougars football seasons
2022 in sports in Washington (state)